The magnificent sunbird (Aethopyga magnifica) is a species of bird in the sunbird family which feed largely on nectar, although they will also take insects, especially when feeding young. Flight is fast and direct on their short wings. Most species can take nectar by hovering like a hummingbird, but usually perch to feed most of the time.  It is endemic to the western Philippines found in the Visayan islands of Negros Island, Panay, Cebu, Tablas Island and Romblon.  It wasas once considered a subspecies of the crimson sunbird which is found in Borneo, Sumatra and Sulawesi.

Description 

EBird describes the bird as "A stunning small bird of lowland and foothill scrub and gardens in the western Visayas. Male has a bright red head, back, and chest, a purple forehead, a broadening purple mustache stripe, a purple tail, black wings and belly, and a bright yellow patch on the lower back. Similar to Purple-throated, but larger; male lacks the purple throat, and female is mainly olive with distinctive reddish wings and tail. Call is a repeated high-pitched chik.

Habitat and Conservation Status 
It is found in fruiting and flowering trees in primary, secondary and cultivated areas up to 1000 masl. 

IUCN has assessed this bird as least concern  with the population trend being assessed as stable. This is due to the species being able to tolerate degraded forest and cultivated areas unlike other forest specialists.

References

magnificent sunbird
Endemic birds of the Philippines
Birds of Cebu
Birds of Negros Island
Birds of Panay
Fauna of Marinduque
magnificent sunbird
magnificent sunbird